Aashish Lama (born 1 December 1996) is a Nepali footballer who plays as a forward for Nepali club Butwal Lumbini and the Nepal national team.

References

External links
 

Living people
1996 births
Nepalese footballers
Nepal international footballers
Association football forwards